Endotricha decessalis is a species of snout moth in the genus Endotricha. It was described by Francis Walker in 1859, and is known from Sri Lanka, China (Fujian), Burma, the Seychelles, Sarawak and the Andaman Islands.

Subspecies
Endotricha decessalis decessalis (Sri Lanka, China (Fujian), Burma, the Seychelles)
Endotricha decessalis major Whalley, 1963 (Sarawak, Andaman Islands)

References

Moths described in 1859
Endotrichini
Fauna of Seychelles